Vatica stapfiana is a species of plant in the family Dipterocarpaceae. It is found in Sumatra, Peninsular Malaysia, and Thailand. This tree is an endangered species threatened by habitat loss.

References

stapfiana
Trees of Sumatra
Trees of Peninsular Malaysia
Trees of Thailand
Endangered flora of Asia
Taxonomy articles created by Polbot